Punjab Forest and Wildlife Department is a law enforcement agency for the state of Punjab, India. It focus primarily on forest development and wildlife conservation. Also it introduce various acts, policies for Forestry Research, Soil Conservation, Forest Management and Eco Tourism.

Its headquarters is located in Sector-68, Mohali, Punjab.

Wildlife Protected Areas
There are 12 Wildlife Sanctuary, two Zoological Park/Tiger Safari, three Dear Parks and two community reserves in Punjab which is managed by this department. Following is list of same:

 Bir chahal Wildlife Sanctuary - Mansa
 Bir Dosanjh Wildlife Sanctuary - Patiala
 Bir Bhadson Wildlife Sanctuary - Patiala
 Bir Mehas Wildlife Sanctuary - Patiala
 Bir Gurdialpura Wildlife Sanctuary - Patiala
 Bir Aishwan Wildlife Sanctuary - Sangrur
 Harike Wildlife Sanctuary - Ferozepur
 Takhni-Rehmapur Wildlife Sanctuary - Hoshiarpur
 Abohar Wildlife Sanctuary - Ferozepur
 Jhajjar Bacholi Wildlife Sanctuary - Rupnagar
 Kathlaur-Kaushlian Wildlife Sanctuary - Gurdaspur

Following are parks:
Mohindra Chaudhary Zoological Park - Chhatbir, Mohali 
Tiger Safari - Ludhiana
Deer Park - Neelon Ludhiana
Deer Park Bir Moti Bagh - Patiala
Deer Park Bir Talab - Bhatinda

Following are community reserves:
Lalwan Community Reserve - Hoshiarpur
Keshopur-Chhamb Community Reserve - Gurdaspur

References

Government of Punjab, India
Forest administration in India